Libia was a protected cruiser built in Italy in the 1900s. The ship had originally been laid down in 1907 for the Ottoman Navy and was to have been named Drama, and was based on the Ottoman cruiser . She had not been completed by the outbreak of the Italo-Turkish War in 1911 and so she was seized by the Italian Regia Marina (Royal Navy) and was completed in 1913.

Libia had a relatively uneventful career. Before Italy's entry into World War I, she was involved in the evacuation of Prince William, the ruler of Albania, from Durazzo in late 1914. Following Italy's declaration of war in May 1915, Libia patrolled the Otranto Barrage but did not see action. In 1921–1922, she went on a world tour, during which she was featured in a short documentary produced by the then-unknown Frank Capra. In 1925 she was deployed to China, where she remained for nearly a decade. In 1937, the old cruiser was stricken from the naval register and sold for scrap.

Design
The design for the new protected cruiser was a copy of the British-built Ottoman cruiser , and was originally intended for sale to the Ottoman Navy. The ship was fitted with two pole masts. She had an inverted bow and a flush deck. Her superstructure consisted of a tall conning tower forward and a smaller, secondary conning tower aft of the mainmast. Her crew numbered 14 officers and 300 enlisted men.

Libia was powered by two vertical triple-expansion steam engines, each of which drove a screw propeller. Steam for the engines was provided by sixteen coal-fired Niclausse water-tube boilers that were trunked into three closely spaced funnels on the centerline.

The ship was armed with a main battery of two  L/50 quick-firing guns placed in individual pivot mounts, one forward and one astern. These were augmented by a secondary battery of eight  L/45 guns, four mounted individually on each broadside. Close-range defense against torpedo boats was provided by a battery of eight  L/50 guns and six  L/20 guns. She was also equipped with four  torpedo tubes.

Her conning tower had the same thickness of armor plating on the sides.

Service history
The new cruiser was laid down in 1907 at the Ansaldo shipyard in Genoa for the Ottoman Empire, under the name Drama. But following the rise of the Young Turks in the Ottoman Empire, the Ottoman government became unwilling to pay its foreign debts, which led Ansaldo to halt construction work. Work on the ship only resumed in late 1911 when Italy seized the ship following its declaration of war against the Ottoman Empire in the Italo-Turkish War. The completed hull was launched on 11 November 1912, and following the completion of fitting-out work, the new ship was commissioned on 25 March 1913.

World War I
On 3 September 1914, Libia was in the port of Durazzo, Albania when Prince William, the ruler of the country, departed following turmoil caused by an insurgency in the country, coupled with the outbreak of World War I. Libia had landed a contingent of marines to restore order in the city, where some 2,000 refugees fleeing the insurgents attempted to board passenger ships bound for Italy. After the refugees were evacuated, Libia recalled her marines and departed as well.

Italy had declared neutrality at the start of World War I, but by July 1915, the Triple Entente had convinced the Italians to enter the war against the Central Powers. Admiral Paolo Thaon di Revel, the Italian naval chief of staff, believed that the threat from Austro-Hungarian submarines and naval mines in the narrow waters of the Adriatic was too serious for him to use the fleet in an active way. Instead, Revel decided to implement a blockade at the relatively safer southern end of the Adriatic with the main fleet, while smaller vessels, such as the MAS boats, conducted raids on Austro-Hungarian ships and installations. In September 1916, Libia was deployed to the Bay of Salamis as part of an Allied fleet in response to the Greek government's refusal to oppose the German and Bulgarian occupation of Eastern Macedonia, which resulted in the Allies seizing the Greek fleet during the Noemvriana. During the war, the ship had three 76 mm L/40 anti-aircraft guns installed.

Postwar career

In 1921 the ship went on a world tour under the command of Captain (later Admiral) Ernesto Burzagli. During the cruise, she stopped in San Francisco, United States in November, where she stayed for a month. While there, she was filmed for a short documentary by the then-unknown film director Frank Capra on 6 and 7 November—though it did not generate much attention, it was Capra's first publicly screened film. The ship departed San Francisco on 4 December. In 1922, Libia visited Australia while on her tour.

In 1925, her 152 mm guns were removed. These ships contributed men to form the Battaglione Italiano in China (Italian Battalion in China); the contingents from Libia were sent to guard the consulates in Beijing and Shanhaiguan.

Kangtai sank with the loss of 30 crew members. Libia remained in Chinese waters for nearly a decade; in the early 1930s, she was replaced by the protected cruiser . In September 1935 she was drydocked to prepare for her disposal. She was stricken from the naval register on 11 March 1937 and was sold to ship breakers.

Notes

References

External links
 Libia Marina Militare website

Cruisers of the Regia Marina
World War I cruisers of Italy
Ships built in Genoa
Ships built by Gio. Ansaldo & C.
1912 ships
Maritime incidents in 1929